Iridomyrmex azureus is a species of ant in the genus Iridomyrmex. Described by Viehmeyer in 1914, specimens collected have been found in dry habitats in Western Australia and South Australia, and also in New South Wales and the Northern Territory.

References

Iridomyrmex
Hymenoptera of Australia
Insects described in 1914